The Bruderndorf Sandstone is a geologic formation in Austria. It preserves fossils dated to the Paleogene period.

See also 
 List of fossiliferous stratigraphic units in Austria

References 

Geologic formations of Austria
Paleocene Series of Europe
Paleogene Austria
Danian Stage
Sandstone formations
Paleontology in Austria